Mae Ngai is an American historian and Lung Family Professor of Asian American Studies and Professor of History at Columbia University. She focuses on nationalism, citizenship, ethnicity, immigration, and race in 20th-century United States history.

Early life and education 

Ngai is the daughter of Chinese immigrants and describes herself as a student who took a non-traditional route. She took a break from her schooling in 1972 to work as a community activist. After working in the Education and Political Action Department and the Consortium for Worker Education as a researcher and professional labor educator in an environment "where being Chinese and being American existed in tension, but not in contradiction," Ngai decided to pursue graduate school focusing on immigration studies.

Ngai graduated from Empire State College with a BA and Columbia University with a M.A. in 1993 and Ph.D. in 1998, where she wrote her dissertation under Eric Foner.

Career and research
After graduation, Ngai obtained postdoctoral fellowships from the Social Science Research Council, the New York University School of Law, and, in 2003, the Radcliffe Institute.  She taught at the University of Chicago as an associate professor before returning to Columbia as a full professor in 2006.

Ngai is especially interested in problems of nationalism, citizenship, and race as they are produced historically in law and society, in processes of transnational migration, and in the formation of ethno-racial communities.

In addition to publishing in numerous academic journals, Ngai has written on immigration and related policy for the Washington Post, the New York Times, the Los Angeles Times, The Nation, and the Boston Review.

Ngai's most notable work was Impossible Subjects: Illegal Aliens and the Making of Modern America, which discusses the creation of the legal category of an "illegal alien" in the early 20th century and its social and historical consequences and context.

Courses taught 

 Immigrants in American History and Life, Lecture
 Colonization/Decolonization, Undergraduate Seminar
 Transnational Migration and Citizenship, Graduate & Undergraduate Seminar 
 Historiography for PhD students

Awards and honors

Fellow of the American Academy of Arts and Sciences, 2022
Bancroft Prize, 2022
Shelby Collum Davis for Historical Studies, Princeton University, Spring 2018
Kluge Chair in Countries and Cultures of the North, Library of Congress, Fall 2017
Huntington Library, Spring 2017
Woodrow Wilson International Center for Scholars, 2013
OAH-AHRAC China Residency Program, 2013
Chiang Ching-Kuo Foundation for International Scholarly Exchange, 2012
Cullman Center for Scholars and Writers, New York Public Library, 2012
Institute for Advanced Study, 2009
John Simon Guggenheim Memorial Foundation, 2009
Huntington Library, 2006
Frederick Jackson Turner Award, Organization of American Historians for Impossible Subjects: Illegal Aliens and the Making of Modern America, 2005
Theodore Saloutos Book Award, the Immigration and Ethnic History Society, 2004
Littleton-Griswold Prize, the American Historical Association, 2004
Radcliffe Institute for Advanced Study, Harvard, 2003
NYU Law School, 2000
Social Science Research Council, 1999

Selected works 
"The Strange Career of the Illegal Alien", Law and History Review, Spring 2003, Vol. 21 No. 1
"The Architecture of Race in American Immigration Law", The Journal of American History, June 1999, Vol. 86 No. 1

Ngai, Mae (2011) "A Slight Knowledge of the Barbarian Language": Chinese Interpreters in Late-Nineteenth and Early-Twentieth-Century America"

Ngai, Mae (March 2015). "Chinese Gold Minders and the "Chinese Question" in Nineteenth-Century California and Victoria"

References

Sources 
 Impossible Subjects: Illegal Aliens and the Making of Modern America, Princeton University Press, (2004)

External links

21st-century American historians
American writers of Chinese descent
Columbia University alumni
Columbia University faculty
Historians of the United States
Living people
University of Chicago faculty
Radcliffe fellows
Empire State College alumni
American women historians
21st-century American women writers
Year of birth missing (living people)
Fellows of the American Academy of Arts and Sciences